First United Church (formerly the Knox Presbyterian Church, from 1913 to 1943) is a designated municipal heritage property.  Originally built in 1916, at a cost of $25,000 to house the Presbyterian denomination; in 1943 after the Swift Current Metropolitan Methodist Church burned down the two denominations merged to form the united church.

See also
United Church of Canada

References

United Church of Canada churches in Saskatchewan
Churches completed in 1913
Buildings and structures in Swift Current
1913 establishments in Saskatchewan
20th-century churches in Canada